Sir James Glenny Wilson (probably on 29 November 1849 – 3 May 1929) was a New Zealand politician and farmer.

Biography

Originally from Hawick, Roxburghshire in Scotland, Wilson was educated at Bruce Castle School, in London, and then at the Edinburgh Institution. He emigrated to Victoria in 1870 and worked on a sheep run. He met his future wife, Annie Adams, at the Melbourne Club. She was born in 1848 at Greenvale, Victoria.  He went to New Zealand in January 1873 and purchased a large block of rough land in an area between what is now Bulls and Sanson in the Rangitikei district. Once established, he returned to Australia and married Annie Adams near Skipton, Victoria.

Wilson represented Foxton in the 8th, 9th & 10th Parliaments (1881–1890), then Palmerston North in the 11th Parliament (1890–1893), and then Otaki in the 12th Parliament (1893–1896), after which retired. The  in the  electorate was contested by six candidates, and he beat Charles Beard Izard, Walter Buller, George Warren Russell, Alfred Newman, and W. France.

Wilson was knighted in 1915, and died at Bulls on 3 May 1929. He was the first president (1902–1920) of the Farmer's Union, now Federated Farmers. Ormond Wilson was his grandson. His Uncle was the MP James Wilson, Financial Secretary to the Treasury, founder of The Economist, and the chartered banks of India, Australia, and China.

References 

|-

1849 births
1929 deaths
Members of the New Zealand House of Representatives
New Zealand farmers
Scottish emigrants to New Zealand
People educated at Bruce Castle School
People from Hawick
People educated at Stewart's Melville College
New Zealand MPs for North Island electorates
New Zealand Knights Bachelor
New Zealand politicians awarded knighthoods
Scottish emigrants to colonial Australia
19th-century New Zealand politicians